The Meaning of Everything: The Story of the Oxford English Dictionary is a 2003 book by Simon Winchester.  It concerns the creation of the Oxford English Dictionary under the editorship of James Murray and others, one aspect of which Winchester had previously written about in 1998 in The Surgeon of Crowthorne: A Tale of Murder, Madness and the Love of Words.

Sources

External links
Presentation by Winchester on The Meaning of Everything, November 20, 2003, C-SPAN

2003 non-fiction books
21st-century history books
Books by Simon Winchester
History books about literature
Oxford University Press books
Works derived from the Oxford English Dictionary